Radio Mafisa 93.4 FM is a South African community radio station based in the North West.

Coverage areas 
Rustenburg
Brits
Hartebeespoort
Magaliesburg
Swartruggens
Ventersdorp
Ga-Rankuwa

Broadcast languages
Tswana
English

Broadcast time
24/7

Target audience
Whole community, primarily youth
LSM Groups 1 - 8
Age Group 16 - 35

Programme format
40% Talk
60% Music

Listenership figures

References

External links
 Official Website
 SAARF Website

Community radio stations in South Africa
Mass media in North West (South African province)